Holland Herald is the inflight magazine of the Dutch airline KLM. Launched in 1966 it is the oldest inflight magazine.

History and profile
Holland Herald was first published on 21 January 1966. In the first year the magazine was published bimonthly and black and white. Next year its frequency was switched to monthly. The magazine is published in English.

Holland Herald was formerly published by the Ink Publishing. The company began to publish it in 2009. As of 2019 Hearst is the publisher of the magazine.

CNN named Holland Herald as the tenth best inflight magazine worldwide in 2012. The content of the magazine includes articles concerning the contemporary Dutch culture, commerce, and politics. The first 3D advertisement was published in the magazine which featured a beer brand, Heineken.

References

External links
 Official website

1966 establishments in the Netherlands
Air France–KLM
Bi-monthly magazines published in the Netherlands
English-language magazines
Gruner + Jahr
Hearst Communications publications
Inflight magazines
Magazines established in 1966
Magazines published in Amsterdam
Monthly magazines published in the Netherlands
Tourism magazines